The Laos national rugby union team represents Laos in international rugby union. The team's first international match was against Malaysia in 1974, losing 34 points to 10.  After this the Laotian team did not field an international side again until 2006.  With the recent reorganisation of the Asian rugby union competition structure they are set to play more often in the future. The Lao Rugby Federation is the governing body. Laos has been an associate member of World Rugby (formerly IRB) since November 2004.

External links
 Lao Rugby official site

 Laos on IRB.com
 Laos on rugbydata.com

Asian national rugby union teams
Rugby union in Laos
Rugby union